KMXX is a commercial radio station in Imperial, California, broadcasting to the Imperial Valley, California area on 99.3 FM.

External links
 

MXX
Regional Mexican radio stations in the United States
Imperial County, California
Entravision Communications stations